Edward Corwin Finch (February 2, 1862 – September 25, 1933) was an American politician in the state of Washington. He served in the Washington State Senate from 1927 to 1931.

References

1862 births
1933 deaths
People from Lebanon, Ohio
Washington (state) state senators